During the 2002–03 English football season, Norwich City competed in the Football League First Division.

Season summary
In the 2002–03 season, the Canaries made an impressive start with just one defeat in their first 14 league games, picking up 29 points from the possible 42 which saw them amongst the candidates for promotion but an inconsistent run towards the end of the season saw Norwich miss out on a play-off spot after only 7 league wins at the end of Christmas.

Final league table

Results
Norwich City's score comes first

Legend

Football League First Division

FA Cup

League Cup

Players

First-team squad
Squad at end of season

Left club during season

Notes

References

Norwich City F.C. seasons
Norwich City